Wolfgang Zanger (born  4 December 1968) is an Austrian politician who has been a Member of the National Council for the Freedom Party of Austria (FPÖ) from 2006 to 2019.

References

1968 births
Living people
Members of the National Council (Austria)
Freedom Party of Austria politicians